Harrison Cassar (born 27 September 1997) is an Australian judoka. He won a bronze medal at the 2022 Commonwealth Games in Birmingham, England. He claimed a bronze medal at the Asian Open in Hong Kong in 2018.

References

External links 
Cassar at IJF.org

1997 births
Living people
Australian male judoka
Judoka at the 2022 Commonwealth Games
Commonwealth Games medallists in judo
Commonwealth Games bronze medallists for Australia
20th-century Australian people
21st-century Australian people
Medallists at the 2022 Commonwealth Games